Chris or Christopher  Richmond may refer to:
 Chris Richmond (entrepreneur) (born 1986), businessman and entrepreneur
 Chris Richmond (film producer), British film and television production designer
 William Richmond (politician) (Christopher William Richmond, 1821–1895), New Zealand politician